George M. Szabo III (born 1970 in Philadelphia, Pennsylvania) is an American Star class sailor. He won the 2009 Star World Championships together with Rick Peters, and was second at the 2003 Snipe World Championships in Borstahusen.

He was also 4 times North American champion (1998, 1999, 2000 and 2003) U.S. National champion (1997, 1998, 1999, 2000 and 2005) in Snipe and 3 times US Sailing Champion of Champions.

References

American male sailors (sport)
Star class world champions
Snipe class sailors
1970 births
Living people
People from San Diego
World champions in sailing for the United States
San Diego State Aztecs sailors